Al Taawoun Football Club  is a professional multi-sports club based in Buraidah, Saudi Arabia. The football team competes in the Saudi Professional League, the top tier of Saudi Football.

The club play their home games at King Abdullah Sport City Stadium in Buraidah, sharing the stadium with city rivals Al-Raed with whom they contest the Qasim Derby with.

History
Al-Taawoun were founded in the year of 1956 under the name of "Al-Shabab" by their founder Saleh Al Wabili. Four years after the founding of the club, they were officially registered as a professional club in 1960.

On the 25th of May 1990 Al-Taawoun reached the 1990 king cup final to face Al-Nasser but eventually lost 0-2. By reaching the final Al-Taawoun became the second First Division side to reach the final after Al-Riyadh in 1978. In the 2009–10 season Al-Taawoun won promotion to the Pro League for the first time in over thirteen years as runners-up in the first division, their last appearance in the top flight was in the 1997-98 season. They have been playing consecutively in the Saudi Professional League since the 2010–2011 season. On 29 May 2016, Al-Taawoun qualified to their debut AFC Champions League campaign for the first time ever by finishing fourth in the league during the 2015–16 season.  

Their best ever top-flight season came in the 2018–19 season when the club successfully challenged for the Asian Champions League spots, eventually finishing in third place in the Saudi Professional League, their highest ever league position to date. And to top off their season, Al-Taawoun reached the King Cup final by thrashing Al-Hilal 5-0 at the King Saud Stadium in the semi-final, and went on to defeat Al-Ittihad 2-1 in the final to claim their first-ever top-flight trophy, with the winning goal coming in the 90th minute. Al-Taawoun also became the first club from Al-Qassim Region to win the King Cup. 

In the following season (2019-20), Al-Taawon's performances were one of their worst in their league history. Al-Taawoun booked their spot in the 2019 super cup by winning the King Cup title the previous season. Al-Taawoun lost to Al-Nasser 4–5 in a penalty shoot-out after a 1–1 draw at the end of extra time. The club were almost relegated and needed a win in the final matchday against relegation threatened Al-Fayha, the highly tense match continued as a draw until the 91st minute when Mohammad Al-Sahlawi converted a cross with a tap in to make it 1-0 and avoid relegation in the final moments of the season. In the 2020-21 season Al-Taawoun reached their 3rd king cup final in the 2020–21 edition to face Al-Faisaly, in the end Al-Faisaly won their first title after a 3–2 win over Al-Taawoun in the final on 27 May 2021.  

Al-Taawoun Qualified to the 2020 AFC Champions League as 2019 King Cup winners and 2018–19 Saudi Professional League 3rd place, Al-Taawoun finished the group as runners-up with a record of (3W,3L) to qualify to the knockout stages for the first time in their history. Al-Taawoun faced Al-Nasser in the round of 16 but eventually lost 0-1.

Honours
King Cup
Winners (1): 2019
Runners-up (2): 1990, 2020–21
Super Cup
Runners-up (1): 2019
Saudi First Division (Level 2)
Winners (1): 1996–97
Runners-up (2): 1994–95, 2009–10
Saudi Second Division (Level 3)
Winners (1): 1977–78
Prince Faisal bin Fahd Cup for Division 1 and 2 Teams
Winners (4): 1996–97, 2000–01, 2007–08, 2008–09

Coaching staff

Current squad

Unregistered players

Out on loan

International competitions

Overview

Record by country

International record

Matches

Managers

 Eoin Hand (July 1, 1987 – June 30, 1988)
 Antal Szentmihályi (1991–92)
 Marco Cunha (2004)
 Tohid Sebravî (2008–09)
 Celso Fernandes (2008–09)
 Abderrazek Chebbi (May 31, 2009 – January 1, 2010)
 Grigore Sichitiu (January 10, 2010 – May 9, 2010)
 Gheorghe Mulțescu (July 3, 2010 – December 20, 2010)
 Florin Motroc (December 22, 2010 – December 29, 2011)
 Srećko Juričić (January 1, 2012 – January 20, 2012)
 Grigore Sichitiu (January 20, 2012 – April 1, 2012)
 Khalid Kamal (caretaker) (April 1, 2012 – June 24, 2012)
 Gjoko Hadžievski (July 1, 2012 – February 20, 2013)
 Taoufik Rouabah (February 2013 – September 2014)
 José Manuel Gomes (September 2014 – May 29, 2016)
 Darije Kalezić (June 2, 2016 – October 16, 2016)
 Constantin Gâlcă (October 18, 2016 – March 20, 2017)
 José Manuel Gomes (March 21, 2017 – May 2, 2018)
 Pedro Emanuel (May 7, 2018 – May, 2019)
 Paulo Sérgio (May 21, 2019 – December 29, 2019)
 Abdullah Asiri (caretaker) (December 29, 2019 – January 15, 2020)
 Vítor Campelos (January 15, 2020 – August 30, 2020)
 Abdullah Asiri (caretaker) (August 30, 2020 – September 16, 2020)
 Patrice Carteron (September 16, 2020 – March 12, 2021)
 Nestor El Maestro (March 13, 2021 – August 22, 2021)
 José Manuel Gomes (August 22, 2021 – March 20, 2022)
 John van den Brom (March 31, 2022 – May 7, 2022)
 Mohammed Al-Abdali (caretaker) (May 7, 2022 – June 28, 2022)
 Péricles Chamusca (June 29, 2022 – )

References

External links
Al-Taawoun's official website
Al-Taawoun page at goalzz.com
Al-Taawoun page at slstat.com

 
Taawoun
Taawoun
Taawoun
Taawoun
Taawoun